Silvero Pereira (born 20 June 1982) is a Brazilian actor and director. He has a degree in performing arts from the Federal Institute of Ceará.

Career  
Silvero started his artistic career at the age of 17 doing theatre. He has been married for ten years to the playwright from Rio de Janeiro, Rafael Barbosa. The artistic collective  was founded by Silvero fourteen years ago. Composed of transsexual and transvestite actors, actresses and artists, the project is carried out in Fortaleza and has already produced seven shows, with seasons in the South and Southeast regions. 

His film debut was in the feature film Serra Pelada (2013), which later became a series on Globo. During a performance of the play BR-Trans in Rio de Janeiro, Silveiro was discovered by Glória Perez, who invited him to participate in the nine o'clock soap opera, A Força do Querer (2017). For this work, he was nominated in the 22nd edition of the Best of the Year Award from Brazil in the category best new actor. 

His recognition grew when he starred in the film Bacurau, by Kleber Mendonça Filho and Juliano Dornelles. For this role, Silvero won several awards, including the Grande Prêmio do Cinema Brasileiro. 

In 2021, it was announced that Silvero will play fashion designer Clodovil Hernandes in a series directed by Rodrigo Cesar.

Filmography

References 

Living people
1982 births
Brazilian film actors
Brazilian television actors
Brazilian LGBT actors